Goran Škundrić (born 1987) is a Serbian volleyball player, currently playing for Serbian club OK Novi Sad - Maneks.

References

Living people
1987 births
Serbian men's volleyball players
People from Odžaci
European Games competitors for Serbia
Volleyball players at the 2015 European Games
Serbian expatriate sportspeople in Romania
Expatriate volleyball players in Romania